Associação Atlética Cultural Copagril, is a Brazilian sports club based in Marechal Cândido Rondon. It was founded in 1974 by the Cooperativa Agroindustrial Copagril, an industrial farming cooperative from western Paraná and southern Mato Grosso do Sul. It's futsal team currently plays in Liga Futsal.

Club honours

National competitions
 Jogos Abertos Brasileiros: 2008

State competitions
 Chave Ouro (3): 2009, 2013, 2016
 Chave Prata: 2004
 Chave Bronze: 2001
 Taça Paraná de Futsal (3): 2009, 2010, 2012
 Jogos Abertos do Paraná (2): 2007, 2008
 Torneio dos Campeões de Futsal do Paraná: 2014

Current squad

References

External links
 Copagril Futsal official website
 Copagril Futsal LNF profile
 Copagril Futsal in zerozero.pt

Futsal clubs established in 1974
1974 establishments in Brazil
Futsal clubs in Brazil
Sports teams in Paraná